Akira Suzuki may refer to:

, Japanese animator
, Japanese chemist and creator of the Suzuki reaction
, Japanese writer and journalist

See also
Suzuki (disambiguation)